Archidendron lovelliae, the bacon wood or tulip siris, is a small tree with a very restricted range in eastern Australia.

The bacon wood stands about 5 meters tall and has a rounded habit.  Flowers are red, and the black seeds are contained in orange pods.  Leaves are bipinnate.

External links  
  Information

lovelliae
Plants described in 1893